Michael Anthony Buchanan, Jr. (born January 24, 1991) is a former American football defensive end. He was drafted by the New England Patriots in the seventh round of the 2013 NFL Draft. He played college football at Illinois.

Early years
He attended Homewood-Flossmoor High School. He was selected to the Champaign News-Gazette All-State team. He was a four-star recruit according to Rivals.com. He also was ranked as the 14th defensive end prospect nationally by Rivals.com. He was ranked as the 59th overall prospect in the Midwest by SuperPrep. He also was ranked as a top-100 defensive end overall prospect by ESPNU. He chose Illinois over Purdue and Vanderbilt.

College career
He was selected to the Second-team All-Big Ten in 2011 and 2012 seasons. In his senior season, he was selected to the Illinois Fighting Illini's Outstanding Defensive Player and Defensive Lineman at annual postseason banquet.

Professional career

New England Patriots
Buchanan was drafted in the 7th round (226th overall) by the New England Patriots of the NFL. The Patriots originally obtained the selection used to draft Buchanan in a trade that sent Aqib Talib to the Patriots. During the two years with the Patriots, Buchanan played in 18 games recording 9 tackles, five quarterback hits, and 2 sacks. On October 6, 2014, Buchanan was placed on Injured reserve for the rest of the 2014 season including the Patriots win over the Seattle Seahawks in Super Bowl XLIX.

Buffalo Bills
On June 2, 2015, the NFL's Buffalo Bills announced the signing of defensive end/linebacker Michael Buchanan. On August 31, 2015, he was released by the Bills.

BC Lions
On October 13, 2015, Buchanan was signed to the practice roster of the BC Lions of the Canadian Football League (CFL). On November 10, 2015, he was released by the Lions.

Toronto Argonauts
On July 17, 2016, Buchanan was signed as a free agent by the Toronto Argonauts of the CFL.

Personal life
He is the son of Michael Buchanan Sr., and Lolita Jordan.

References

External links
Illinois Fighting Illini bio
New England Patriots bio

1991 births
Living people
African-American players of American football
African-American players of Canadian football
American football defensive ends
American football linebackers
BC Lions players
Buffalo Bills players
Canadian football defensive linemen
Edmonton Elks players
Illinois Fighting Illini football players
New England Patriots players
People from Homewood, Illinois
Players of American football from Illinois
Sportspeople from Cook County, Illinois
Toronto Argonauts players
Homewood-Flossmoor High School alumni
21st-century African-American sportspeople